Bunschoten is a municipality and a town in the Netherlands, in the province of Utrecht.  It lies about 7 km north of Amersfoort.  Its territory comprises the original municipality of Bunschoten (created in 1204 by the bishop of Utrecht) and the former municipality of Duyst, De Haar and Zevenhuizen, which was a part of Hoogland from 1854 until 1971.

History 
Bunschoten was first named in 1294.  It was located on the border between Utrecht and Guelders, and it suffered a number of times from invasions from Guelders.  In 1383, the bishop of Utrecht gave Bunschoten city rights, which allowed the citizens to build an earthen wall around the town. The fortifications and a part of the town were destroyed at Christmas 1427 in a war between two rival bishops, and were never rebuilt.

Population centres 
The municipality of Bunschoten consists of the following cities, towns, villages and/or districts:

Notable people 
 Bert Groen (born 1945) a Dutch politician, former Mayor of Bunschoten
 Melis van de Groep (born 1958 in Bunschoten) a Dutch politician, Mayor of Bunschoten since 2006 
 Job Koelewijn (born 1962 in Spakenburg) a Dutch conceptual artist, sculptor, installation artist, performance artist and photographer
 Gijsbert Van Bismarck (born 1973 in Spakenburg) a retired footballer with over 150 club caps
 Kevin van Diermen (born 1989 in Spakenburg) a Dutch professional footballer with over 200 club caps
 Aileen de Graaf (born 1990 in Spakenburg) a Dutch darts player playing in the British Darts Organisation.

Gallery

References

External links

Official website

 
Municipalities of Utrecht (province)
Populated places in Utrecht (province)